Sardarshahar Assembly Constituency is one of constituencies of Rajasthan Legislative Assembly in the Churu (Lok Sabha constituency).

Sardarshahar Constituency covers all voters from Sardarshahar tehsil excluding ILRC Ratoosar and part of Ratangarh tehsil, which includes ILRC Golsar.

Members of Legislative Assembly

References

See also 
 Member of the Legislative Assembly (India)

Churu district
Assembly constituencies of Rajasthan